Dhawalagiri Zone was one of the fourteen zones of Nepal, comprising four districts, namely, Baglung, Mustang, Myagdi and Parbat. Here is district wise List of Monuments which is in the Dhawalagiri Zone.

Dhawalagiri Zone
 List of monuments in Baglung District 
 List of monuments in Myagdi District 
 List of monuments in Mustang District
 List of monuments in Parbat District

References

Dhawalagiri Zone
Dhaulagiri Zone